Y. P. Varshni (born 1932) is a scientist in the areas of physics and astrophysics.

Varshni studied at Allahabad University, where he obtained his BSc in 1950, his MSc in 1952, and his PhD in 1956.  He published his first research paper in 1951 at the age of 19. He served as an assistant professor in the Physics Dept., Allahabad University for the period 1955–60.

He emigrated to Canada as a postdoctoral fellow at the National Research Council, Ottawa, Canada in July 1960, where he worked in theoretical physics under Ta-You Wu for two years. In July 1962, Varshni was appointed as assistant professor in the Department of Physics at the University of Ottawa. He became associate professor in July 1965 and full professor in July 1969. He retired in June 1997 and was then appointed as Emeritus Professor.

Varshni worked in several areas of physics and astrophysics. He developed the laser star model of quasars, which was not accepted by the astronomical community. He published more than 260 research papers in peer-reviewed scientific journals, and contributed three biographies to the Biographical Encyclopedia of Astronomers. Varshni was the PhD advisor of David Joseph Singh.

He was made a Fellow of the American Physical Society, Institute of Physics (UK) and Royal Astronomical Society (UK). He is also a member of the American Astronomical Society.

External links
Varshni's homepage at U of Ottawa
Plasma Laser Star theory of quasars.

1932 births
Living people
20th-century Canadian astronomers
Canadian physicists
20th-century Indian physicists
Indian astrophysicists
University of Allahabad alumni
Academic staff of the University of Allahabad